Garrick Davis (born 1971 in Los Angeles) is an American poet and critic. He was Poetry Editor of First Things magazine from 2020 until 2021.

Career
Davis is the founding editor of the Contemporary Poetry Review, the largest online archive of poetry criticism in the English-speaking world. His criticism appears regularly in the Contemporary Poetry Review. 

Davis' work has also been published in the New Criterion, the Weekly Standard and Humanities magazine.

His poetry has appeared in a number of literary magazines including Verse, McSweeney’s, the Alabama Literary Review, and the New York Sun.

He is the historian of the National Endowment for the Arts in Washington DC. He has also served as the NEA's Literature Specialist (2005–2008) as well as the specialist responsible for the NEA's Arts Journalism Institutes and the Poetry Out Loud program.

Contemporary Poetry Review
The Contemporary Poetry Review, the largest online archive of poetry criticism in the English-speaking world, was founded in 1998, and was one of the earliest literary reviews in the United States to be published exclusively on the Internet. Regular contributors to the review have included a number of distinguished American poet-critics including Ernest Hilbert, David Yezzi, Adam Kirsch, Dillon Tracy, Bill Coyle, and Joan Houlihan. Its regular foreign contributors include the Irish poet-critics Justin Quinn and David Wheatley, and the Indian critic Rabindra Swain. Ernest Hilbert edited the Contemporary Poetry Review, from 2005-2010.

Books

Poetry
Terminal Diagrams (Ohio University Press/Swallow, 2010)

Anthologies
Child of the Ocmulgee: The Selected Poems of Freda Quenneville. Edited by Garrick Davis (Michigan State University Press, 2002)

Praising It New: The Best of the New Criticism. Edited by Garrick Davis (Ohio University Press, 2008)

Personal life
Davis is married. He lives with his wife the Newsmax Journalist Emerald Robinson and son in the suburbs of Washington DC.

External links

Videos
 Garrick Davis reads "Drive Song" for Huffington Post

Articles
 Remembering the Criterion New Criterion. Feb. 2007.
 Jarrell Dug Auden The Weekly Standard. March 12, 2007.
 Master in Disguise: Samuel Menashe April 17, 2006.
 The Will to Innocence New Criterion. Feb. 2008.
 The Well Wrought Textbook Humanities Magazine. July/August 2011.
 What to Make of T. S. Eliot? Humanities Magazine. Fall 2016.
 Old Possum in Full Glory: The Complete Prose of T. S. Eliot First Things. November 2016.
 Caribbean Rhapsode: Farewell to Derek Walcott First Things. August 2017.
 Farewell to Geoffrey Hill First Things. August, 2018.
 The Scandal of Our Schools Human Events. October, 2019.

Articles:CPR
 Toward the New Futurism Contemporary Poetry Review. 2002.
 Hart Crane: American Futurist Contemporary Poetry Review. 2003.
 On the Golden Age of Poetry Criticism Contemporary Poetry Review. 2003.
 The Lasting Importance of The Cantos Contemporary Poetry Review. 2004.
 CPR Remembers: Villiers de l’Isle-Adam Contemporary Poetry Review. 2005.
 The Innocent Ear: Some Thoughts on the Popular Disdain for Versification Contemporary Poetry Review. 2005.
 The Sharp Compassion of the Healer’s Art: Adam Kirsch Contemporary Poetry Review. 2005.
 CPR Remembers: Count Robert de Montesquiou Contemporary Poetry Review. 2012.

Interviews:CPR
 Dana Gioia and the Role of the Poet-Critic Contemporary Poetry Review. 2003
 Stephen Burt and the Role of the Poet-Critic Contemporary Poetry Review. 2003
 Adam Kirsch and the Role of the Poet-Critic Contemporary Poetry Review. 2004
 Timothy Steele and the Role of the Poet-Critic Contemporary Poetry Review. 2005
 William Jay Smith and the Role of the Poet-Critic Contemporary Poetry Review. 2008
 Rachel Hadas and the Role of the Poet-Critic Contemporary Poetry Review. 2009

Poems
 For Harry Crosby Cortland Review. Summer 2006.
 While Reading the Revelation of St. John the Divine, I Turn on the Television The Potomac Review. Feb. 2007.
 Night High Above the Los Angeles Basin Drunken Boat. March 2009.
 Villa Jovis New Criterion. May, 2013.

Translations
 Arnaut Daniel: “The Firm Desire” McSweeney's. Dec. 2004.

Reviews of His Books
 What We Owe the New Critics by Mark Bauerlein The Chronicle of Higher Education. Dec. 2007.
 Forward into the Past: Reading the New Critics by William Logan Virginia Quarterly Review. Summer 2008.
 Harvesting the Wasteland by Adam Kirsch New York Sun. August 13, 2008.
 Grammars of a Possible World by David Yezzi The New Criterion. April 2008.
 When Lit-Crit Mattered by James Seaton Wall Street Journal. August 2, 2008.
 Rediscovering the New Critics by Aaron Urbanczyk First Principles. 2010.
 The 10,000 Hour Rule by Gilbert Wesley Purdy Eclectica Magazine. July/Aug 2011.
 The Game We Play with the Game We Play by Gilbert Wesley Purdy Eclectica Magazine. July/Aug 2009. 
 Terminal Diagrams Reviewed by G. M. Palmer Strong Verse. 2011.

References

Living people
American male poets
1971 births